Ulysses S Grant Peak is a  mountain summit located on the shared boundary of San Juan County with San Miguel County, in southwest Colorado, United States. It is situated eight miles west of the community of Silverton, on land managed by San Juan National Forest and Uncompahgre National Forest. Ulysses S Grant Peak is part of the San Juan Mountains which are a subset of the Rocky Mountains, and is west of the Continental Divide. It ranks as the 119th-highest peak in Colorado, and topographic relief is significant as the west aspect rises  in approximately one mile. The mountain's name, which has been officially adopted by the United States Board on Geographic Names, was in use in an 1896 scientific publication by Charles Whitman Cross, and listed by Henry Gannett when he published A Gazetteer of Colorado in 1906.

Climate 
According to the Köppen climate classification system, Ulysses S Grant Peak is located in an alpine subarctic climate zone with long, cold, snowy winters, and cool to warm summers. Due to its altitude, it receives precipitation all year, as snow in winter, and as thunderstorms in summer, with a dry period in late spring. Precipitation runoff from the mountain drains west into tributaries of the San Miguel River, and east to the Animas River via Mineral Creek.

See also

Gallery

References

External links 

 Weather forecast: Ulysses S Grant Peak
 U S Grant Peak and Island Lake: Flickr photo

Mountains of San Miguel County, Colorado
Mountains of San Juan County, Colorado
San Juan Mountains (Colorado)
Mountains of Colorado
North American 4000 m summits
San Juan National Forest
Uncompahgre National Forest